Sanjay and Craig is an American animated television series produced by Nickelodeon. The series premiered on May 25, 2013. The series follows the adventures of a human boy named Sanjay and his best friend, a talking snake named Craig. On a promotional webpage for the show, the network explains that Sanjay and Craig's suburban hijinks require that "no one finds out that Craig can talk."

On September 12, 2013, Sanjay and Craig was renewed for a second season by Nickelodeon and it premiered on July 12, 2014 and ended on October 9, 2015.

On June 11, 2014, Sanjay and Craig was renewed for a third and final season by Nickelodeon and it premiered on September 7, 2015 and ended on July 29, 2016.

Series overview

Episodes

Season 1 (2013–14)

Season 2 (2014–15)

Season 3 (2015–16)

Notes

References 

Lists of American children's animated television series episodes
Sanjay and Craig